Padbol is a fusion sport created in La Plata in 2008, combining elements of football, tennis, volleyball and squash.

It is currently played in Argentina, Australia, Austria, Belgium, Denmark, France, Israel, Italy, Mexico, Panama, Portugal, Romania, Spain, Sweden, Switzerland, United States and Uruguay.

History
Padbol was created in 2008 by Gustavo Miguens in La Plata, Argentina.
The first track was laid in 2011 and elsewhere in Argentina such Rojas, Punta Alta, Buenos Aires.
Then tracks in Spain, Uruguay and Italy and more recently were added in Portugal, Sweden, Mexico, Romania and England. Australia, Bolivia and France are newest countries.

In 2013 was the first Padbol World Cup in La Plata. The champions were the Spanish pair, Ocaña and Palacios.

In 2014 was the second edition in Alicante, Spain. The champions were the Spanish pair  Ramón and Hernández.

The third edition took place at Punta del Este, Uruguay , in 2016

Rules

Court 
The playing area is a rectangle 10 meters long and 6 meters wide (inside measurements). It is divided transversely by a network that is suspended by a wire of a maximum diameter of 1 cm, whose ends are subject to two support posts, and their inner faces coincide with the lateral boundaries of the court.
in each funds of the playing area there is a pediment and two side walls attached to it. The gable and the sidewalls should be at least 2.50 meters and be equal to each other.
The net height is between 90 and 100 centimeters in the center and 100 cm maximum at the ends.
Must be at least one access to the track with a minimum width of 0.60 meters and a height of 2 meters per side. It may or may not have a door.

Areas 

There are three zones : Service Zone, Reception zone and Red Zone.

Service zone : This is where the server must meet to perform their serves and is bounded by the line is 3.25 meters in the network, the sidewalls and the bottom wall.

Reception area : Is located between the network, the central service line, the line that goes from side to side of the track (width) and side glass and/or close the perimeter wall. The lines marked on the floor are included in the valid Box for long.

Red zone : The area that forms a meter for each side's net, delineated by a line between cut and breadth of the entire court.  It must be red.

Ball 
The ball shall have a uniform outer surface and shall be white or yellow.
Its perimeter is 670 mm, and it should be of polyurethane; its weight can range from 380 grams to 400 grams.

Summary 

 Players: 4. Played in a doubles format.
 Serves: Serve must be underhand. A second serve is allowed in the event a fault, as in tennis.
 Score: Scoring method is the same as in tennis. Matches are best of three sets.
 Ball: Football but smaller
 Court: There are two styles of courts: indoor and outdoor
 Walls: Walls or fences are part of the game.

Tournaments

Padbol World Cup 

In March 2013 it developed the first World Cup in La Plata, Argentina. Participated sixteen couples of Argentina, Uruguay, Italy and Spain.
In the Final, Ocaña/Palacios  won 6-1/6-1 against Saiz/Rodriguez.

The second Padbol World Cup was held in November 2014 in Alicante, Spain .
Participated 15 couples from seven countries (Argentina, Uruguay, Mexico, Spain, Italy, Portugal and Sweden).
Ramón/Hernández won the final 6-4/7-5 against Ocaña/Palacios.

The third edition will be held in Punta del Este, Uruguay, in 2016.

World Rankings

Current ranking

See also 
 Football tennis
Padel

References

External links 

 Padbol Official Page
 Padbol Romania

Ball games
Association football variants
Hybrid sports